Belmont Junction railway station was a railway station that served the civil parish of Belmont in County Durham, North East England, from 1844 to 1857. It was located at the junction between the main line and  branch of the Newcastle and Darlington Junction Railway.

History 
The station opened as Belmont on 15 April 1844 by the Newcastle & Darlington Junction Railway. It was situated north of the railway bridge over the A690, close to junction 62 of the A1. The station name was changed to Belmont Junction in 1852. This station is far closer to the centre of Durham than the former station at Gilesgate was and thus the Gilesgate branch and Belmont Junction closed to all traffic on 1 April 1857.

References

External links 

Disused railway stations in Northumberland
Former North Eastern Railway (UK) stations
Railway stations in Great Britain opened in 1844
Railway stations in Great Britain closed in 1857
1844 establishments in England
1857 disestablishments in England